OPEX is an alternative trading system (ATS) that is managed by PEX (Private Exchange), based in Lisbon, Portugal. The market was launched in 2003 to provide a trading environment to the small and mid cap securities of Portuguese companies.

Currently the market is making valiant attempts to survive and attract enough liquidity. Its perseverance seems to have paid off with trading volumes showing a rising trend in the past one year.

External links
 OPEX website

Stock exchanges in Europe